Don Roby (15 November 1933 – 10 June 2013) was an English professional footballer who played as a right half.

Career
Born in Wigan, Roby played for Notts County, Derby County, Burton Albion and Loughborough United.

References

Footballers from Wigan
1933 births
2013 deaths
English footballers
Notts County F.C. players
Derby County F.C. players
Burton Albion F.C. players
Loughborough United F.C. players
English Football League players
Association football wing halves